Mearnsia is a genus of swift in the family Apodidae. 

It contains the following species:
 Philippine spine-tailed swift (Mearnsia picina)
 Papuan spine-tailed swift (Mearnsia novaeguineae)

 
Bird genera
Taxonomy articles created by Polbot